The Bangladesh Textile Mills Association or BTMA is the national trade body for textile mills, manufacturers, and mills in Bangladesh and is located in Dhaka, Bangladesh. It carries out research on the textile industry in Bangladesh. Tapan Chowdhury, the Chairman of Square Group, is the president of the trade association.

History
Bangladesh Textile Mills Association was established & has been registered in 1983 with the Registrar of Joint Stock Companies as an Association, not for profit, under the Companies Act 1994. It is managed by 27 Board of Directors, 3 vice presidents and one president. Its certificate is necessary for the import of textile machines in Bangladesh. It along with the Bangladesh Knitwear Manufacturers and Exporters Association (BKMEA) and Bangladesh Garment Manufacturers and Exporters Association (BGMEA) represent the garment industry in Bangladesh. It established the National Institute of Textile Engineering and Research (NITER) in partnership with the Ministry of Textiles and Jute.

Activities
It is the national trade body representing the country's yarn, yarn manufacturers and textile product processor mills under the private sector.

Past presidents
 A.M. Zahiruddin Khan
 Alhaj M.A. Hashem
 M. M. Amjad Hussain
 Salahuddin Kasem Khan
 Saleh Ahmed
 Waliul Islam
 Mohammad Shahjahan
 Salman Fazlur Rahman
 Abdul Matin Chowdhury
 M. A. Awal
 Abdul Hai Sarker
 Tapan Chowdhury
 Mohammad Ali Khokon

References

Trade associations based in Bangladesh
1983 establishments in Bangladesh
Textile industry of Bangladesh
Organisations based in Dhaka
Textile industry associations